Orthogonius doriae is a species of ground beetle in the subfamily Orthogoniinae. It was described by Putzeys In Chaudoir in 1871.

References

doriae
Beetles described in 1871